Danevang is an unincorporated community in southern Wharton County, in the U.S. state of Texas. The rural community is located south of El Campo on State Highway 71 (SH 71). The name Danevang means Dane Meadow. The town was founded in the 1890s mostly by Danes who migrated from the American Midwest. After a period of prosperity people began moving away in the 1920s. The community's church was still open in 2013.

History
Danevang was established by Danish settlers in 1895.

Geography
Near the crossroads is a US post office, several agricultural storage buildings and a number of dwellings. The Danevang Lutheran Church is a short distance to the east of the museum on County Road 426. Land under agriculture surrounds the homes and other buildings at the site.

Climate
The climate in this area is characterized by hot, humid summers and generally mild to cool winters.  According to the Köppen Climate Classification system, Danevang has a humid subtropical climate, abbreviated "Cfa" on climate maps.

References

Danish-American history
Unincorporated communities in Texas
Unincorporated communities in Wharton County, Texas
Populated places established in 1895
1895 establishments in Texas